El viento is a 2005 Argentine film directed and co-written by Eduardo Mignogna and starring Federico Luppi, Antonella Costa and Pablo Cedrón. This was Mignogna's last film.

Synopsis
Old ranch hand Frank Osorio (Luppi) travels from Patagonia to Buenos Aires to bring the news of his daughter's demise to his granddaughter, Alina (Costa). The film chronicles the week they share at Alina's apartment, the mending of their estranged relationship and the ultimate truth that Frank has been keeping from her about her father's identity.

External links
 
 El viento at the 2nd edition of Venice Days (62nd Venice International Film Festival)

2005 films
Argentine romantic drama films
2000s Spanish-language films
2000s Argentine films